{{DISPLAYTITLE:Leukotriene B4 receptor 1}}

Leukotriene B4 receptor 1 is a protein that in humans is encoded by the LTB4R gene.

See also
 Eicosanoid receptor
 Etalocib, an antagonist at the leukotriene B4 receptor

References

Further reading

External links

 
 

G protein-coupled receptors